Julien Fountain (born 1970) is an English professional cricket coach and former Great Britain baseball player. He is known primarily as a specialist fielding coach but has also performed the roles of head coach and assistant coach. He has worked on the coaching staffs of the West Indies, Pakistan, Bangladesh, and England and has coached at 36 test matches, 106 ODIs, and 28 T20 Internationals. This includes two ICC Fifty Over World Cups, one ICC T20 World Cup, one Asia Cup, and one Champions Trophy. He has also coached at a wide variety of domestic or franchise fixtures.

He coaches both international and domestic or franchise cricket and was part of the BPL Winning Dhaka Gladiators coaching staff in 2012 and the Stanford Superstars coaching staff in 2008, when the team beat England convincingly in a one off Twenty Million Dollar game in Antigua during the Stanford Super Series.

Fountain was the first baseball player to be used as a Specialist Fielding Coach by any test level cricket team when he was hired in 1998 by the West Indies to coach on their tour of South Africa. On the 2000/01 West Indies tour of Australia he took to the field as substitute fielder for the West Indies against the Prime Ministers eleven at the Manuka Oval in Canberra. He rose to the challenge by running out Anthony McQuire with a direct hit from the boundary.
He has acted as Substitute Fielder (12th Man) a total of four times for both West Indies in 2001 & 2007 and Pakistan in 2013.

Along with ICC Full Member teams, he has coached both ICC Associate & ICC Affiliate cricket teams, during his career and was recently the head coach of South Korea during the 2014 Asian Games in Incheon who were the host nation. They achieved great success, despite having very little playing experience, taking eight wickets against the Sri Lanka national cricket team in the quarter final. Other teams who have used him include Ireland, Bermuda, Trinidad and Canada.

During the 2010 Micromax ODI series against Zimbabwe, Fountain was appointed temporary head coach of Bangladesh, for the 3rd and 4th ODI's, whilst Jamie Siddons attended the birth of his second child back in Australia. Bangladesh won the 3rd ODI, however the fourth was abandoned due to rain. This made Fountain the first baseball coach to achieve head coach status with an ICC full member nation cricket team, as well as being the first baseball coach to instruct an ICC full member nation cricket team (West Indies in 1998).

In March 2012 Fountain was re-appointed as specialist fielding coach for Pakistan, and was based at the National Cricket Academy in Lahore, Pakistan. He worked exclusively with Pakistan cricketers at Test, ODI and T20 matches and was able to raise the standard of fielding significantly during his two-year tenure, which saw Pakistan win the 2012 Asia Cup and achieve both ODI and T20 success against Sri Lanka, India, and South Africa.

In January 2015 Fountain launched a project called Switch Hit 20 designed to help former professional baseball players transition into T20 cricketers. This coincided with him accepting an invitation from the American Cricket Federation (ACF) to join their Honorary Advisory Board, where he joins existing HAB members Arjuna Ranatunga, Ian Chappell, Clive Lloyd, Shaun Pollock, Michael Holding, Stuart MacGill, Damien Martyn, Nathan Bracken, Alvin Kallicharran, Niall O'Brien, Vince Adams, Ian Pont, and Stephen Rooke.

Playing career

Cricket
Fountain was born in Shoreham-by-Sea, Sussex, and started his cricket career as a medium pace all rounder (he later switched to wicket keeping because of his preference for fielding) for Somerset within their youth development teams. He was selected to play in the Somerset Under 19 team aged only 15 due to an injury to the regular wicket keeper. He was removed from the squad at the end of the season in 1987.

Baseball
In need of a fresh challenge, he decided to take up baseball, having watched the 1987 World Series between the Minnesota Twins and the St. Louis Cardinals. In July 1988 Fountain was selected to represent Great Britain U19 Baseball Team at the European Championships in Bordeaux, France, having only played baseball for six months. The following year he made his debut for the full Great Britain National Baseball Team, still aged only 19. He represented Great Britain, as part of the British Olympic Squad in the European Baseball Championships in 1989 in Paris, France and again in 1991 in Rome, Italy. Fountain represented Great Britain as a pitcher between 1988 and 2002.

In 1989, Fountain played as part of the British Olympic Baseball Team versus an MLBPA – Major League Players Alumni Legends team at Old Trafford Cricket Ground. The Legends team was composed of household names Bert Campaneris, Doug DeCinces, Bob Feller, Mark Fidrych, Tim Foli, George Foster, Jerry Grote, Mike Hargrove, Tug McGraw, Graig Nettles, Lary Sorensen, Willie Stargell, Rennie Stennett, Luis Tiant, Roy White, Billy Williams, and Al Oliver.

During this period he also attended several professional tryouts with Major League Baseball teams including the Kansas City Royals, Chicago White Sox and New York Mets. He approached a number of US universities, with the intention of taking up a scholarship, but was rejected. He continued playing in the UK whilst attending Thames Valley University in London.

In 2002, he was recalled to the Great Britain Baseball Team, to add strength and experience to their pitching staff during a qualification tournament in Stockholm, Sweden.

England youth teams and County Cricket
In 1996, having returned to his home town of Taunton, he was approached by the British Baseball Federation to assist with a cricket course run by the NCA or National Cricket Association which is now known as the England and Wales Cricket Board. He was immediately recognised by local participants as a former Somerset County youth cricketer, and was bombarded with questions about how baseball skills transfer into cricket. This course was organised by ECB National Coach Gordon Lord, a former first-class cricketer and national coach who immediately involved him with the coaching of England youth teams. He became the official ECB Fielding Specialist Coach for all the England youth teams and coached players such as Andrew Flintoff, Chris Read, Ben Hollioake, Graeme Swann Michael Carberry and Owais Shah. He also coached the England women's cricket team,.. Fountain coached at the majority of County Cricket teams between 1996 and 1998, holding fielding clinics both pre, mid and post season throughout the UK.

International coaching debut 1998

West Indies 'A'
In 1998 Fountain had hoped to become part of the coaching staff for the full England team, under David Lloyd, however an offer was not forthcoming despite having successfully coached extensively around the County Cricket circuit as a specialist fielding coach; so when he was approached by the West Indies Cricket Board to coach The West Indies 'A' Team in Antigua, he jumped at the chance as this would allow him to finally coach at the highest levels of cricket.

West Indies tour of South Africa 1998
Having run a successful pre-tour clinic in Antigua with West Indies "A" he was asked to accompany the full West Indies cricket team on their tour of South Africa and the WICB Advanced Course in Trinidad and Tobago, he was ecstatic as he was able to flourish as a coach, working with some of the world's best cricketers. Unfortunately, his tour was cut short due to the impending players strike. However, following this introduction he was retained as part of the West Indies back room staff under head coach Malcolm Marshall. He was labelled as "essential" by Tony Cozier, a well-respected cricket journalist. He rejoined the senior team in Jamaica for the second Test and achieved fantastic results immediately, culminating in a fantastic series finish in Barbados. It was during this series that he established himself as a leader in his field even claiming to have fixed Courtney Walsh's throwing arm.

Cricket World Cup 1999
He accompanied the West Indies Cricket team to the UK for the Cricket World Cup however the team's performance was unfortunately overshadowed by the sudden illness of head coach, Malcolm Marshall.

Queens Park Cricket Club, Trinidad
In 2000 following his successful involvement with the West Indies in the Caribbean and the Cricket World Cup he was appointed as head coach, at Queens Park Cricket Club in Trinidad and he combined coaching with playing for the club throughout the 2000 season. During his tenure he oversaw the development of exciting new talent such as Dwayne Bravo and Devon Smith. It was whilst performing this role he was again contracted by the WICB to coach the senior West Indies team, for a preparatory camp, in Jamaica before joining them as their specialist fielding coach on their tour of Australia.

West Indies Tour of Australia 2000/01
This tour was a particularly tough one for the West Indies, where they struggled in most departments, however the fielding continued to improve under the guidance of Fountain. It was during this tour that Fountain had to put his money where his mouth was when, due to a large number of injuries, he had to take to the field as West Indies Substitute Fielder (12th Man) during the Prime Minister's Xl fixture at the Manuka Oval, Canberra. He rose to the challenge by running out Anthony McGuire with a direct hit from the boundary. He was also required as Substitute Fielder (12th Man) against Australia 'A' in Hobart, Tasmania.

South Africa's Tour of West Indies 2001
In 2001, following the tour of Australia, he returned with the team to the Caribbean for the home series against South Africa. This series saw Fountain's involvement diminished, despite the benefits which were definitely showing. This led to allegations of underhand treatment of Fountain and other management members by the WICB.

Pakistan 'A' Team Tour of Sri Lanka 2001
After parting company with the West Indies due to contractual difficulties, Fountain was approached by the Pakistan Cricket Board to act as assistant and specialist coach for the Pakistan A cricket team on their tour of Sri Lanka under head coach Mudassar Nazar, an appointment which was seen as "clearly necessary". 
Upon completing the Sri Lanka tour, Fountain accompanied the team back to Pakistan where he was tasked with holding Elite Coaching Clinics at all the major academies including Karachi, Lahore, Peshawar and Rawalpindi. He attended a week-long camp in Karachi under the guidance of head coach Richard Pybus with the senior Pakistan national cricket team working with the players prior to their upcoming home series. He also held a series of clinics for Pakistan coaches at each of the venues.

Upon returning to the UK, due to his absence from the ECB system, his unofficial role as ECB fielding coach had been filled by various former players including Trevor Penney and Gary Palmer, and consequently he fell out of favour with the governing body. Despite making a huge contribution to the improved way fielding was taught in professional cricket, he was unable to further his coaching career despite achieving all the relevant coaching qualifications and even becoming a tutor on ECB Courses.

Director of Cricket, Pangbourne College 2002
In 2002, Fountain took up a pastoral position at Pangbourne College in Berkshire which allowed him to expand his coaching experience in the role of director of cricket and head coach. Whilst fulfilling this role he also gained valuable experience teaching physical education and coaching hockey.

Pakistan tour of England 2006

In 2006, having both grown as a coach and gained valuable coaching experience, he was hired by Bob Woolmer to act as specialist fielding coach for the Pakistan national cricket team on their tour of England. During the tour his role as specialist fielding coach was reduced to allow greater input into the team's batting performance. He was used extensively by both junior and senior players such as Inzamam-ul-Haq, Younis Khan, Mohammad Yousuf, and Shahid Afridi as a one-to-one batting coach. He was in the Pakistan dressing room at The Oval on that fateful day in August 2006 when the infamous alleged "Ball tampering" incident occurred.

England 'A' & ECB National Academy 2006/07
Over the winter of 2006/2007, with this new-found international experience and exposure, Fountain was hired by Peter Moores, the ECB national academy director at the time, to work with England 'A' Team players, England youth team players, National Skill Set and Regional Skill Set Players.

West Indies Tour of England 2007
In 2007 the West Indies cricket team were touring England and the new head coach David Moore, on the recommendation of the senior players, requested Fountain's assistance as a specialist fielding coach for the remainder of the NPower Test Series and the ODI / T20 series. This proved to be a turning point for the team, as at the start of the series the fielding was below standard, however after having spent time reinforcing the skills, the team entered the ODI / T20 series with a new-found enthusiasm for fielding which proved instrumental in the Nat West ODI Series win for the West Indies. Fountain had to put on the whites as fielding 12th man yet again in 2007, against the Marylebone Cricket Club (MCC) at Durham.

Head coach England U16 & England T20 Squad 2007
After the Nat West ODI series finished, he returned to the National Cricket Performance Centre, continuing his work with both current and up and coming England Cricketers, culminating in his selection as head coach of the England Under 16 for a series against Australia Under 16, which England swept where he was able to pass on not only the elite fielding skills, but the batting and bowling knowledge he had gained over his extensive international career. This tenure was one of his proudest moments in coaching as not only did England U16 sweep the series against Australia U16, without losing a game, but finally he gained recognition as a coach in his own right capable of coaching all aspects of cricket, not simply fielding. It was also at this time that he achieved another seemingly unattainable milestone by coaching England T20 specialist players at the National Performance Centre, prior to their departure to South Africa for the T20 Cricket World Cup.

Pro Batter Video Simulator Pitching Machines
Whilst at the National Performance Centre in September 2007, Fountain, after a recent research trip to the US, brought the concept of using the Pro Batter Video Simulator Pitching Machine for cricket to the attention of Peter Moores and David Parsons. He introduced the company, Pro Batter Sports, to the England & Wales Cricket Board and in 2010 Pro Batter completed the installation of two units at the National Performance Centre at Loughborough. It was not until Dene Hills, an Australian Cricket Coach, joined the ECB in late 2008, as batting coach, that they finally got in touch with Pro Batter regarding the possibility of using the machines for cricket; something Fountain had identified over a year before.

Stanford T20 Cricket, 2007 and 2008

Stanford Professional Franchise Teams

Late 2007 Fountain was contacted by the Stanford T20 Cricket organisation, who had established professional teams in Antigua, Nevis, St Lucia and Anguilla. He spent a few weeks not only assessing and coaching these newly formed professional teams, but conducting a complete audit of each organisation, looking at coaching, facilities, players and every aspect of their day-to-day operations. It was also at this time, and following the guidelines of the McLaurin Report, that England decided that they should hire a full-time fielding coach and despite his long standing involvement with the ECB, going back over 10 years, and his extensive international resume, which at that time had three full international teams and countless worldwide professional teams on it, was pipped to the post by part-time cricket coach, PE Teacher and Director of Sport at Wellington College Richard Halsall who was more familiar to the newly appointed England Head coach, Peter Moores, due to his link with Sussex County Cricket Club .

Stanford Superstars
In 2008, the Stanford relationship was to prove crucial, as Fountain was again hired by Stanford T20 Cricket, to be the official fielding coach for the newly formed Stanford Superstars professional cricket team. The Stanford Superstars were formed with the intention of playing a one off Twenty Million Dollar Game against England at the Stanford Cricket Ground in Antigua on 1 November 2008, which is incidentally, Antigua's Independence Day. The event became the Stanford Super Series of cricket where Middlesex County Cricket Club from England, along with Trinidad and Tobago national cricket team, both of which had won their respective domestic T20 tournaments, joined England and the Superstars to play in a round robin series of games in Antigua, culminating in the 20 million dollar game against England on 1 Nov. The Superstars beat England convincingly. 
As history shows the Stanford Superstars capitalised on their intensive coaching regime under Eldine Baptiste, Roger Harper, Cardigan Connor and Fountain, by winning every game they played that week and receiving 20 million dollars, the biggest winners pay cheque ever offered in cricket. 
There were mixed feelings across the world, both in the lead up to and following the series; and events have since proved that perhaps the Stanford connection within cricket may have been ill-advised for many, however the potential good that may have come from his involvement with West Indies cricket, will now never be fulfilled, leaving the regions cricketing future in the balance.

ICC High Performance Program and Associate Teams

Ireland
In early 2009, Fountain was appointed as "Specialist Fielding Coach" to the Irish cricket team, under former West Indies Cricketer, Phil Simmons, during their World Cup Qualifying Tournament in South Africa, which proved to be highly successful, with Ireland not only winning the tournament, which they had previously never achieved, but retaining their ODI status along with qualifying for the next cricket world cup in 2011. Later in 2009 he again assisted Ireland when they played in Aberdeen against Scotland and in Stormont, Ireland during their ODI game against England which they narrowly lost.

Canada
In December 2009 Fountain held clinics in St Kitts for the Canada Under 19 and West Indies Under 19 Squads, prior to their entry into the Under 19 world Cup in New Zealand in 2010. In March 2010, Fountain joined Bermuda as part of their coaching staff, on the recommendation of former West Indies & Australian Commonwealth Bank Academy Coach, David JA Moore. This was as part of their preparation camp held at the HPC (High Performance Centre) University of Pretoria, South Africa, for a short tour of Namibia.

Bermuda
In April 2010, Fountain was hired by the ICC, International Cricket Council, High Performance Unit to assist Ireland and Canada as part of their coaching staff, during their participation in the Jamaica Cricket Festival. Whilst on this assignment he also assisted with coaching Ireland in Trinidad, prior to their participation in the ICC World T20 Tournament in the Caribbean. In May, Fountain was again hired by Bermuda to help with the team's preparation for the ICC Americas Division 1 Championship to be held on Bermuda. He held a series of specialist fielding and T20 Batting Clinics for the Bermuda Team. He also held sessions for young Bermuda players, local coaches and local club teams.

Trinidad
While in Trinidad, Fountain was invited to run "Specialist Fielding Clinics" for the highly acclaimed Trinidad & Tobago National Team, who were preparing for the Champions League qualification process.

ICC High Performance Program
In July 2010, Fountain attended the ICC World Cricket League Division 1 Championships in the Netherlands as the "Fielding Specialist Consultant" as part of the ICC High Performance Department. Other consultants included Mudassar Nazar (Batting), Dayle Hadlee (Bowling), Jeremy Snape / Michael Caulfied (Sporting Edge Performance), Dr Sherylle Calder / Christi Botha (Vision Training), Patrick Farhart (Physiotherapy / Player Management), Andy Russell (Strength & Conditioning), and SportsMechanics (I) Pvt Ltd (Match Analysis).

Bangladesh 2010
In 2010 rumours flooded the cricket media that Fountain was set to become the fielding coach of the Bangladesh national cricket team with former South African Cricketer Lance Klusener set to become Bowling Coach
This story was proved at least partly correct, when it was announced by the BCB that Fountain had indeed, joined the coaching and support staff of the Bangladesh Team. Kleusener finally turned down the role of bowling coach, which was then awarded to the highly acclaimed, and significantly more qualified, Ian Pont.

New Zealand tour of Bangladesh
Fountain and Pont got off to a good start with Bangladesh after "Tiger Washing" the New Zealand team 4-0 during the Micromax ODI Series in October 2010. This is the first time Bangladesh has had a series win over a full-strength, Test-playing nation in its 10-year history and subsequently rose to 8th place in the ODI rankings, above West Indies and into the elite top group of teams. 
This was followed in December 2010 by a 3–1 series win over Zimbabwe.

Zimbabwe tour of Bangladesh
As well as handling the fielding, Fountain took a small hand in both batting & bowling coaching whilst working with Bangladesh, assisting not only with fast bowlers with their slower balls, baseball style power mechanics for all batters, actions and release techniques with the spinners and batting fundamentals and tactics with the tail enders.

Temporary head coach of Bangladesh

During the 2010 micromax home series against Zimbabwe, Fountain was appointed temporarily awarded head coach status, whilst Jamie Siddons attended the birth of his second child back in Australia. This was for the third ODI at Sher-e-bangla National stadium in Dhaka, which Bangladesh won

Butterfly Ball

In 2010, whilst on assignment in Bangladesh Fountain and Ian Pont Fast Bowling Coach, combined to use their cricket and baseball backgrounds, to design a completely new slower ball for pace bowlers or variation ball for spin bowlers Having both had experience as baseball pitchers, Fountain and Pont were both well aware of the movement it is possible to achieve, with the correct ball release. The delivery has been named the "Butterfly Ball" due to its erratic movement patterns through the air, and is based on the same aerodynamic principles as baseball's knuckleball.

ICC Cricket World Cup 2011
Fountain was part of the coaching staff for the Bangladesh National Cricket Team during the ICC Cricket World Cup.
Bangladesh played six games at this ICC Cricket World Cup; beating England, Ireland and the Netherlands but losing to India, West Indies and South Africa. They were knocked out at the group stage.

Australia tour of Bangladesh
After the World Cup had finished, Australia toured Bangladesh playing a 3 ODI series, which Australia won 3–0.
Despite dramatically raising the standard of the Bangladesh team's fielding in only a matter of a few months, Fountains contract was not renewed.

Dhaka Gladiators 2012
In 2012 Fountain was hired as specialist fielding coach by the Dhaka Gladiators, a franchise team that plays in the Bangladesh Premier league. He helped them get to the final where they beat the Barisal Burners to win the inaugural BPL.

Pakistan 2012–2014
In March 2012 Fountain was appointed as specialist fielding coach for Pakistan, and was based at the National Cricket Academy in Lahore, Pakistan. He worked exclusively with Pakistan cricketers at Test, ODI and T20 matches and during pre tour camps and clinics. These included, but were not limited to:

A mixture of Test, ODI, and T20 series against Sri Lanka, Australia, South Africa, Zimbabwe, West Indies, Scotland, Ireland and India.
Major tournaments he was involved with were:

Asia Cup 2012 in Bangladesh
Pakistan played four matches; beating both Bangladesh and Sri Lanka in the group stage, but losing to India. Pakistan beat Bangladesh in the final and won the Asia Cup.

ICC T20 World Cup in Sri Lanka
Pakistan played five matches at the 2012 T20 World Cup in Sri Lanka. They beat New Zealand & Bangladesh, to qualify for the super eight stage. They beat South Africa & Australia, but lost to India; however this still qualified them for the Semi Final. They were beaten by Sri Lanka in the semi finals.

ICC Champions Trophy in England
Pakistan played three matches (plus a warmup). They were against South Africa, West Indies & India. Unfortunately Pakistan lost all three and failed to make it out of their group.

Despite a clear improvement in Pakistan's fielding performances, Fountain was not retained after his contract expired.

Head coach of South Korea and Asian Games 2014
In 2014 Fountain was hired as head coach of South Korea who hosted the 2014 Asian Games in Incheon, South Korea The T20 Cricket tournament was played at the Yeonhui Cricket Ground.
Korea played three games during the tournament, against Malaysia, China, and Sri Lanka. They made it into the quarter finals where they were beaten by Sri Lanka, despite a fantastic effort.

Switch Hit 20
In January 2015, Fountain launched a project in the USA designed to help former professional baseball players make the transition to playing T20 Cricket.

ACF Honorary Advisory Board
In February 2015, Fountain was invited to join the Honorary Advisory Board of the American Cricket Federation.

Off the field

"Direct Hit" performance analysis software system for fielding
Fielding, a major component of cricket, has little or no statistical data to call upon when selecting players or making tactical adjustments. This had always puzzled Fountain, as he had extensive experience of baseball where all elements of the game, fielding included, are recorded. In 2010, Fountain's groundbreaking "Fielding Analysis System" for cricket was put into a software package, to allow every aspect of cricket fielding to be scored and analysed, giving a complete picture on a team or individuals performance. The system was first used by Fountain during his early stints with the West Indies on the 2000 / 2001 tour of Australia, and has been 10 years in development. Since that time various people have tried to imitate or copy it, including certain well known TV companies.

TV, radio, magazines, coach education
Fountain has written many articles on fielding, cricket, baseball and coaching which have been widely read, thanks to the internet. He has been featured on a huge range of sports television and radio shows, in all parts of the world. He has been involved with the research, production and presentation of coach education material for a wide variety of organisations including the ICC, ECB, PCB and WICB.

External links 
 Julien Fountain's Cricinfo Player page
Julien Fountain's Pakpassion Blog
 
Julien Fountain's Switch Hit 20 website

References

1970 births
Living people
People from Shoreham-by-Sea
English baseball players
Great Britain
Great Britain national baseball team players
English cricketers
English cricket coaches
Fielding (cricket)
Pakistan Super League coaches